Top Chef Thailand (season 2) is the second season of the Thai reality television series Top Chef Thailand. The season premiered on October 7, 2018. Willment Leong, Suphamongkhon Suppipat, Thidid Tadsanakajon and Phichaya Uthantam served as judges and Pitipat Kutragule as a host for the second season.

Contestants

Summaries

Elimination Table

 Team / Contestant was winning elimination challenge for the episode.
 Team / Contestants nominated in elimination challenge but not win for the episode.
 The contestant was at risk of elimination.
 The contestant was eliminated from the competition in elimination challenge.
 The contestant was eliminated from the competition in quickfire challenge.
 The contestant who have been granted immunity. Not eliminated that week.
 The contestant who have been granted immunity. Not eliminated that week and winning elimination challenge for the episode.
 The contestant was originally eliminated but returned to the competition.
 The contestant was a Runner-Up.
 The contestant won Top Chef Thailand.

Notes
  Blue team has members as follows: Chef Ying-Sita, Chef Gun, Chef Toon and Chef Steve.
  Red team has members as follows: Chef Ying-Sita and Chef Jaguar.
  Blue has members as follows: Chef James, Chef Ying-Sita and Chef Gun.

References

External links 
 Facebook

Thailand, Season 2
2018 Thai television seasons
2019 Thai television seasons